Maurice Barrette (February 17, 1956 – September 30, 2018) was a Canadian professional ice hockey goaltender who played for the Quebec Remparts of the QMJHL, Nova Scotia Voyageurs of the AHL and the Springfield Indians.

Barrette was drafted in the middle rounds, in 1976, by both the Montreal Canadiens of the NHL and Quebec Nordiques while they were part of the WHA.  He played neither a game for the Nordiques nor Canadiens, however.

The biggest highlight of his career was winning the Hap Emms Memorial Trophy for outstanding goaltender in the 1976 Memorial Cup Finals.

References

External links

1956 births
2018 deaths
French Quebecers
Canadian ice hockey goaltenders
Ice hockey people from Montreal
Quebec Nordiques (WHA) draft picks
Quebec Remparts players
Montreal Canadiens draft picks
Nova Scotia Voyageurs players
Springfield Indians players